Vida Vacations is a vacation membership company (also referred to as a timeshare or destination club), which allows its customers to purchase a Right to Use and, more recently, a real estate interest in 15 resorts in Mexico. It was founded in 2010 by Grupo Vidanta, and was originally named "Vida Vacation Club". Before that, in the 1990s it was called Vidafel and sold timeshares.  The total number of rooms is approximately 7,000.

Vida Vacations was formerly known as Mayan Resorts and Grupo Mayan. Resort brands of the company include The Grand Luxxe, The Grand Bliss, The Grand Mayan, The Bliss, Mayan Palace and Sea Garden.  It is affiliated with Interval International, allowing exchanges of vacation time at The Grand Bliss Riviera Maya and The Bliss Nuevo Vallarta. It is also affiliated with the Registry Collection (part of the RCI Global Vacation Network, a subsidiary of Wyndham Worldwide), allowing exchanges with Grand Luxxe Nuevo Vallarta and Grand Luxxe Spa Tower Nuevo Vallarta.

Resort locations
Acapulco
The Grand Mayan
Mayan Palace
Los Cabos
The Grand Mayan
Nuevo Vallarta
Grand Luxxe
The Grand Bliss
The Grand Mayan
Mayan Palace
Riviera Maya
Grand Luxxe
The Grand Bliss
The Grand Mayan
The Bliss
Mayan Palace
La Jolla de Cortes (Puerto Peñasco)
The Grand Mayan
Mayan Palace
Mazatlan
Mayan Palace
Puerto Vallarta
Mayan Palace

See also
Diamond Resorts International
Marriott Vacation Club
Occidental Vacation Club
WorldMark by Wyndham

References

External links
 
 Vida Vacations Resorts
 Vida Vacations official forum

Timeshare chains
Companies based in Mexico City